Jari Korpisalo (born 17 February 1966) is a Finnish former professional ice hockey player.

Playing career
He played 575 games in the SM-liiga with Ässät Pori, scoring 213 goals and 231 assists for 444 points, while accumulating 893 penalty minutes.

Korpisalo competed in the 1993 Men's World Ice Hockey Championships as a member of the Finland men's national ice hockey team.

Personal life
Korpisalo's son, Joonas, is a professional goaltender for the Los Angeles Kings of the National Hockey League (NHL). He also has represented Team Finland in several international junior tournaments.

Career statistics

References

External links
 

1966 births
Living people
Ässät players
EV Landshut players
Finnish expatriate ice hockey players in Canada
Finnish ice hockey forwards
Granby Bisons players
München Barons players
Ice hockey people from Helsinki
Finnish expatriate ice hockey players in Germany